The Doors: Vinyl Box Set is the seventh box set for American rock band the Doors. It is a seven-record set of the original six studio albums, remastered in stereo from the original analogue tapes and pressed on 180-gram HQ vinyl, and a mono version of the debut album. Artwork, packaging (the outer box featured faux lizard skin), and inner sleeves are replicas of the original LPs issued between 1967 and 1971. The albums were remastered from 192k/24 bit digital copies and pressed at Record Technology (RTI). An insert booklet includes notes from Jac Holzman, founder of Elektra Records and Bruce Botnick the Doors' longtime sound engineer/co-producer on all the original studio albums.

Although originally planned for release in October 2007, the box set was finally released on April 22, 2008. The delay was due to an issue with the vinyl, as well as other problems in the production of the box set. Further delays included faulty test pressings, inferiority of the L.A. Woman artwork, and poor compounds in the initial vinyl run, which caused a search for a new source of virgin vinyl. The box set was released via Rhino Records and limited to 12,500 copies.

Track listing
All songs written by Jim Morrison, Robby Krieger, Ray Manzarek, and John Densmore, except where noted.

Disc 2: Strange Days

Disc 3: Waiting for the Sun

Disc 4: The Soft Parade

Disc 5: Morrison Hotel

Disc 6: L.A. Woman

Disc 7 (mono): The Doors
"Break On Through (To the Other Side)" (Morrison) – 2:30
"Soul Kitchen" (Morrison) – 3:35
"The Crystal Ship" (Morrison) – 2:34
"Twentieth Century Fox" (Morrison) – 2:33
"Alabama Song (Whisky Bar)" (Brecht, Weill) – 3:20
"Light My Fire" (Krieger, Morrison) – 7:08
"Back Door Man" (Dixon, Burnett) – 3:34
"I Looked at You" (Morrison) – 2:22
"End of the Night" (Morrison) – 2:52
"Take It as It Comes" (Morrison) – 2:18
"The End" – 11:44

Notes

References

External links
Vinyl Box Set on the Doors web page (Active Site)
Delay on box set release
The Doors Music Co. music shop
Rhino Records

Albums produced by Bruce Botnick
Elektra Records compilation albums
The Doors compilation albums
2008 compilation albums
Albums produced by Paul A. Rothchild
Albums recorded at Sunset Sound Recorders